Various topics in medicine relate to lesbian, gay, bisexual, and transgender people. According to the US Gay and Lesbian Medical Association (GLMA), besides HIV/AIDS, issues related to LGBT health include breast and cervical cancer, hepatitis, mental health, substance use disorders, alcohol use, tobacco use, depression, access to care for transgender persons, issues surrounding marriage and family recognition, conversion therapy, refusal clause legislation, and laws that are intended to "immunize health care professionals from liability for discriminating against persons of whom they disapprove."

LGBT people may face barriers to accessing healthcare on the basis of their sexual orientation and/or gender identity or expression. Many avoid or delay care or receive inappropriate or inferior care because of perceived or real homophobia or transphobia and discrimination by healthcare providers and institutions; in other words, negative personal experience, the assumption or expectation of negative experience based on knowing of history of such experience in other LGBT people, or both.

It is often pointed out that the reason of this is heterosexism in medical care and research:

Especially with lesbian patients, they may be discriminated in three ways:

 Homophobic attitudes;
 Heterosexist judgements and behaviour;
 General sexism – focusing primarily on male health concerns and services; assigning subordinate to that of men health roles for women, as for service providers and service recipients.

Issues affecting LGBT people generally
Research from the United Kingdom indicates that there appears to be limited evidence available from which to draw general conclusions about lesbian, gay, bisexual, and transgender health because epidemiological studies have not incorporated sexuality as a factor in data collection. Review of research that has been undertaken suggests that there are no differences in terms of major health problems between LGBT people and the general population, although LGBT people generally appear to experience poorer health, with no information on common and major diseases, cancers, or long-term health. Mental health appears worse among LGBT people than among the general population, with depression, anxiety, and suicide ideation being 2–3 times higher than the general population. For transgender and gender non-conforming people, these issues are more apparent before transitioning, or in the early stages of transition. There appear to be higher rates of eating disorder and self-harm, but similar levels of obesity and domestic violence to the general population; lack of exercise and smoking appear more significant and drug use higher, while alcohol consumption is similar to the general population.  Polycystic ovaries and infertility were identified as being more common amongst lesbians than heterosexual women.  The research indicates noticeable barriers between LGB patients and health professionals, and the reasons suggested are homophobia, assumptions of heterosexuality, lack of knowledge, misunderstanding and over-caution; institutional barriers were identified as well, due to assumed heterosexuality, inappropriate referrals, lack of patient confidentiality, discontinuity of care, absence of LGBT-specific healthcare, lack of relevant psycho-sexual training. About 30 percent of all completed suicides have been related to sexual identity crisis. Students who also fall into the gay, bisexual, lesbian or trans gendered identity groups report being five times as more likely to miss school because they feel unsafe after being bullied due to their sexual orientation.

Research points to issues encountered from an early age, such as LGBT people being targeted for bullying, assault, and discrimination, as contributing significantly to depression, suicide and other mental health issues in adulthood.  Social research suggests that LGBT experience discriminatory practices in accessing healthcare.

One way that LGB individuals have attempted to deal with discriminatory health care is by seeking "queer-friendly" health care providers.

Causes of LGBT health disparities 
LGBT patients in the United States are often one of the most underserved and poorly-served in hospital or medical settings. Because of their increased mental health issues, they are more in need of medical professional help. During the past decade, the LGBT social movement in United States and worldwide contributed to the increasing trend of public recognition and acceptance toward the community. Reports from the Institute of Medicine, US National Institutes of Health and other nonprofit organizations have called to address the gap in LGBT training and education for healthcare professionals. Current research indicate that LGBT individuals face disparity compared to their heterosexual and cisgender counterparts regarding access to health facilities, qualities, and treatment outcomes. Some causes of lack of access to healthcare among LGBT people are: perceived or real discrimination, inequality in the workplace and health insurance sectors, and lack of competent care due to negligible LGBT health training in medical schools . In an online survey, 65% of health physicians heard negative comments from peers targeting LGBT patients, while 35% witnessed discrimination toward individuals in workplace. Another survey shows that more than 90% of U.S. medical schools reported some hours of LGBT-specific content training in the curriculum during the pre-clinical years, while only two-thirds of schools reported in clinical years. Medical students are less likely to discriminate against LGBT patients if they can practice taking medical history from LGBT patients. Healthcare professionals working with little to no knowledge about the LGBT community can result in a lack of or a decline in the type of healthcare these families receive: "Fundamentally, the distinctive healthcare needs of lesbian women go unnoticed, are deemed unimportant or are simply ignored." Views like these lead to the belief that health care training can exclude the topic related to the healthcare of LGBT and make certain members of the LGBT community feel as though they can be exempt from healthcare without any bodily consequences.

An upstream issue is the relative lack of official data on gender identity that health policy makers could use to plan, cost, implement and evaluate health policies and programs to improve transgender population health. The 'What We Know Project' reviewed thousands of peer-reviewed studies and found a strong link between discrimination and harm to the health of LGBT people. The findings showed that the presence of discrimination, stigma, and prejudice creates a hostile social climate which increase the risk of poor mental and physical health, even for those not directly exposed to the discrimination. This creates a situation known as 'minority stress' which includes low self-esteem and expectations, fear of discrimination and internalized stigma - which all contribute to health disparities.

LGBT health and social support networks 
LGBT health outcomes are strongly influenced by social support networks, peers, and family.  One example of a support network now available to some LGBT youth include Gay-Straight Alliances (GSAs), which are clubs that work to improve the climate for LGBT youth at schools and educate students and staff about issues faced by the LGBT community.  In order to investigate the effects of GSAs on LGBT youth, 149 college-aged students that self-identified as LGBT completed a survey that assessed their high school's climate for LGBT youth, and their current health and alcohol dependency outcomes. Those participants who had a GSA at their high school (GSA+ youth) reported higher senses of belonging, less at-school victimization because of their sexual orientation, more favorable outcomes related to their alcohol use behaviors, and greater positive outcomes related to depression and general psychological distress when compared to those without a GSA (GSA- youth).  Amongst other competing variables that contributed to these outcomes, the vast majority of schools that had a GSA were located in urban and suburban areas that tend to be safer and more accepting of LGBT people in general.

Family and social support networks also relate with mental health trajectories amongst LGBT youth.  Family rejection upon a youth "coming out" sometimes results in adverse health outcomes. In fact, LGBT youth who experienced family rejection were 8.4 times more likely to attempt suicide, 5.9 times more likely to experience elevated levels of depression, and 3.4 times more likely to use illegal drugs than those LGBT youth who were accepted by family members.  Family rejection sometimes leads youth to either run away from home or be kicked out of their home, which relates to the high rate of homelessness experienced by LGBT youth.  In turn, homelessness relates to an array of adverse health outcomes that sometimes stem from homeless LGBT youths' elevated rates of involvement in prostitution and survival sex.

One longitudinal study of 248 youth across 5.5 years found that LGBT youth that have strong family and peer support experience less distress across all-time points relative to those who have uniformly low family and peer support.  Overtime, the psychological distress experienced by LGBT youth decreased, regardless of the amount of family and peer support that they received during adolescence.  Nonetheless, the decrease in distress was greater for youth with low peer and family support than for those participants with high support.  At age 17, those who lacked family support but had high peer support exhibited the highest levels of distress, but this distress level lowered to nearly the same level as those reporting high levels of support within a few years.  Those LGBT youth without family support but with strong support from their peers reported an increase in family support over the years in spite of having reported the lowest family support at the age of 17.

Similarly, another study of 232 LGBT youth between the ages of 16-20 found that those with low family and social support reported higher rates of hopelessness, loneliness, depression, anxiety, somatization, suicidality, global severity, and symptoms of major depressive disorder (MDD) than those who received strong family and non-family support.  In contrast, those who solely received non-family support reported worse outcomes for all measured health outcomes except for anxiety and hopelessness, for which there was no difference.

Some studies have found poorer mental health outcomes for bisexual people than gay men and lesbians, which has been attributed to some degree to this community's lack of acceptance and validation both within and outside of the LGBT community.  One qualitative study interviewed 55 bisexual people in order to identify common reasons for higher rates of mental health problems.  The testimonials that were collected and organized into macro level (social structure), meso level (interpersonal), and micro level (individual) factors.  At the social structure level, bisexuals noted that they were constantly asked to explain and justify their sexual orientation, and experienced biphobia and monosexism from individuals both within and outside of the LGBT community.  Many also stated that their identity was repetitively degraded by others, and that they are assumed to be promiscuous and hypersexual.  During dates with others that did not identify as bisexual, some sighted being attacked and rejected solely based their sexual orientation.  One female bisexual participant stated that upon going on a date with a lesbian female, "...she was very anti-bisexual. She said, 'You're sitting on the fence. Make a choice, either you're gay or straight'" (p. 498).  Family members similarly questioned and criticized their identity.  One participant recalled that his sister stated that she would prefer if her sibling were gay instead of "...this slutty person who just sleeps with everyone" (p. 498).  At the personal level, many bisexual struggle to accept themselves due to society's negative social attitudes and beliefs about bisexuality.  In order to address issues of self acceptance, participants recommended embracing spirituality, exercise, the arts, and other activities that promote emotional health.

Assisted Reproductive Technologies 

LGBTQ individuals face unique problems in having biological children not experienced by cisgender heterosexual men and women. Traditionally parenthood was often seen as impossible for same sex couples and LGBT adoption was encouraged instead, but in recent decades, developmental biologists have been researching and developing techniques to facilitate same-sex reproduction, which could allow for same sex couples to both be biological parents together.

Issues affecting lesbians

Breast cancer

According to Katherine A. O'Hanlan, lesbians "have the richest concentration of risk factors for breast cancer [of any] subset of women in the world." Additionally, many lesbians do not get routine mammograms, do breast self-exams, or have clinical breast exams.

There are also policy documents from both the UK and US Government that stated there could be higher rates of breast cancer among lesbian and bisexual women despite insufficient evidence. In a 2009 report by the UK All Party Parliamentary Group on Cancer's Inquiry into Inequalities in Cancer, it was stated that "Lesbians may have a higher risk of breast cancer.

Depression and anxiety
Depression and anxiety are thought to affect lesbians at a higher rate than in the general population, for similar reasons.

Domestic violence

Domestic violence is reported to occur in about 11 percent of lesbian homes.  While this rate is about half the rate of 20 percent reported by heterosexual women, lesbians often have fewer resources available for shelter and counselling.

Obesity and fitness 
Lesbian and bisexual women are more likely to be overweight or obese. Research shows that on average lesbians have a higher body mass index than heterosexual women.

Substance use disorder
Lesbians often have high rates of substance use, including recreational drugs, alcohol and tobacco. Studies have shown that lesbian and bisexual women are 200% more likely to smoke tobacco than other women.

Reproductive and sexual health 
Lesbian, bisexual, and queer women have many of the same reproductive and sexual health needs as heterosexual women. However, queer women face disparities when it comes to reproductive and sexual health. This may be in part due to lower socioeconomic status and lower rates of insurance, particularly for bisexual individuals. Additionally, sex education (in the U.S.) is largely heteronormative and may not provide information relevant for LGBTQ individuals (see LGBT sex education). Health care providers may not have adequate education regarding sexual orientation, so may not be offering their queer patients appropriate and needed services. In one survey of Ob/Gyn residents, 50% reported feeling unprepared to care for lesbian or bisexual patients and 92% reported a desire for more education on how to provide healthcare to LGBTQ patients. Queer individuals may also face discrimination and bias in the health care setting (and in society more broadly), leading to lower quality health care or deterring individuals from seeking care at all. Given these factors, queer women have specific needs around reproductive and sexual health.

Cervical cancer 
A lack of screening for cervical cancer is among the most obvious and most preventable risk factor for lesbians, bisexual, and queer women in the development of invasive late-stage cervical cancer. Lesbian, bisexual, and queer women are less likely to receive appropriate screening for cervical cancer than heterosexual women, which leads to later detection of cervical cancer.

Contraception 
Lesbian, bisexual, and queer women need access to contraception, both to prevent pregnancy and for a variety of non-contraceptive benefits. Estimates suggest that 3.8 million cisgender lesbian, bisexual and queer women may be using contraceptives in the United States. However, lesbian, bisexual, and queer women are less likely to use contraceptive methods, even when they are engaging in sex that could result in pregnancy.

Abortion 
Lesbian, bisexual, queer, and women who identify with a sexual minority identity seek abortion care. The Guttmacher Institute estimates that approximately 5% of abortion patients in the United States identify as lesbian, bisexual, or queer. Studies relying on measures of self-reported abortions suggest that abortion is common across queer women's lives. Bisexual adolescents are more likely to terminate a pregnancy than their heterosexual counterparts, a difference that persists into adulthood. Across their lifetimes, women who identify with a sexual minority identity were more likely than heterosexual women to experience an unwanted pregnancy or terminate a pregnancy.

Pregnancy healthcare for lesbian women 
There have been several studies that discuss healthcare experiences of pregnant lesbian women. Larsson and Dykes conducted a study in 2009 about lesbian mothers in Sweden. The participants wanted their healthcare providers to confirm and recognize both parents, not just the biological mother. They also wanted their healthcare providers to ask questions about their "life styles" to demonstrate their openness about sexuality. Most of the women in the study commented that they had good experiences with healthcare. However, birth education tended to focus on mother and father dynamics. The forms that were also used tended to be heterosexist (see Heterosexism), only allowing for mother and father identities. To account for these differences, Singer created a document about how to improve the prenatal care of lesbian women in the United States. She found that curiosity about a patient's sexuality can take over an appointment, sometimes placing the patient into a situation where they end up educating the provider. To be inclusive, Singer recommended that healthcare providers should be more inclusive in their opening discussions by saying "So tell me the story of how you became pregnant". Healthcare providers should, according to Singer, use inclusive language that can be used for all types of patients. Healthcare providers were also not aware of how much reproductive health care cost for lesbian couples and they should openly recognize this issue with their lesbian patients. Pharris, Bucchio, Dotson, and Davidson also provided suggestions on how to support lesbian couples during pregnancy. Childbirth educators should avoid assuming that parents are heterosexual or straight couples. They recommend using neutral language when discussing parent preferences. Forms, applications, and other distributed information should be inclusive of lesbian parents. They suggest using terms such as "non-biological mother, co-parent, social mother, other mother and second female parent" are good examples. Asking parents was also a suggested way to figure out what term should be used. Parents may also need help navigating legal systems in the area.

Midwife(wives) and Doula(s) have provided care for lesbian women and couples who are pregnant. In an article in Rewire News, there was a discussion of how midwives and doulas are attempting to improve the overall care of lesbian couples by having specific training based on providing care to these couples as well as having inclusive processes. In a study of lesbian and bisexual women in Canada about using healthcare services, researchers Ross, Steele, and Epstein found that the women in the study loved working with doulas and midwives. Midwives were considered helpful advocates with other healthcare providers that they encountered. Midwives also discuss their perspectives. Röndahl, Bruhner, and Lindhe conducted a study in 2009 about lesbian pregnancy experiences of women in Norway. They found that midwives were the ones who were responsible for creating a space to discuss sexuality. However, midwives in the study felt that they were inadequate about having the communication tools to create this space. Additionally, the researchers found that lesbian couples were seen as different compared to straight couples. The partners have a sense of both love and friendship. Their differences were also seen when trying to find the roles for the lesbian co-mothers (non-biological mothers), as the language and questions asked did not fit their roles. Finally, the researchers found that there needed to be a balance of asking questions and being overly assertive. Midwives could ask questions about the patients' sexuality, but asking too many questions caused discomfort in the patients.

Issues affecting gay men

Depression, anxiety, and suicide
Gay men are more likely to internalize their mental health issues than others in the LGBT community. Studies by Cochran et al. (2003) and Mills et al. (2004), among others, suggest that depression and anxiety appear to affect gay men at a higher rate than in the general population.

According to GLMA, "the problem may be more severe for those men who remain in the closet or who do not have adequate social supports. Adolescents and young adults may be at particularly high risk of suicide because of these concerns. Culturally sensitive mental health services targeted specifically at gay men may be more effective in the prevention, early detection, and treatment of these conditions." Researchers at the University of California at San Francisco found that major risk factors for depression in gay and bisexual men included a recent experience of anti-gay violence or threats, not identifying as gay, or feeling alienated from the gay community.

Results from a survey by Stonewall Scotland published in early 2012 found that 3% of gay men had attempted suicide within the past year.  Despite progress in LGBT rights globally, gay men continue to experience high rates of loneliness and depression after coming out. Suicide rates among men in same-sex relationships fell significantly in Sweden and Denmark after the legalization of same-sex marriage. Researcher Annette Erlangsen suggested that along with other gay rights legislation, same-sex marriage may have reduced feelings of social stigmatization among some homosexual people and that "being married is protective against suicide".

HIV/AIDS 

Men who have sex with men are more likely to acquire HIV in the modern West, Japan, India, and Taiwan, as well as other developed countries than among the general population, in the United States, 60 times more likely than the general population. An estimated 62% of adult and adolescent American males living with HIV/AIDS got it through sexual contact with other men.
HIV-related stigma is consistently and significantly associated with poorer physical and mental health in PLHIV (people living with HIV). The first name proposed for what is now known as AIDS was gay-related immune deficiency, or GRID. This name was proposed in 1982, after public health scientists noticed clusters of Kaposi's sarcoma and Pneumocystis pneumonia among gay males in California and New York City. There is an unspoken fear of getting HIV tested in gay men. This can be because of fear of sexual rejection, not knowing where of how to get tested, and fear of friends/family distancing.

Other sexually transmitted infections
The US Center for Disease Control recommends annual screening for syphilis, gonorrhea, HIV and chlamydia for men who have sex with men.

Black gay men have a greater risk of HIV and other STIs than white gay men. However, their reported rates of unprotected anal intercourse are similar to those of men who have sex with men (MSM) of other ethnicities.

Men who have sex with men are at an increased risk for hepatitis, and immunization for Hepatitis A and Hepatitis B is recommended for all men who have sex with men. Safer sex is currently the only means of prevention for the Hepatitis C.

Human papilloma virus, which causes anal and genital warts, plays a role in the increased rates of anal cancers in gay men, and some health professionals now recommend routine screening with anal pap smears to detect early cancers. Men have higher prevalence of oral HPV than women. Oral HPV infection is associated with HPV-positive oropharyngeal cancer.

Eating disorders and body image
Gay men are more likely than straight men to develop eating disorders such as bulimia or anorexia nervosa. The cause of this correlation remains poorly understood, but is hypothesized to be related to the ideals of body image prevalent in the LGBT community. Obesity, on the other hand, affects relatively fewer gay and bisexual men than straight men

Substance use
David McDowell of Columbia University, who has studied substance use in gay men, wrote that club drugs are particularly popular at gay bars and circuit parties. Studies have found different results on the frequency of tobacco use among gay and bisexual men compared to that of heterosexual men, with one study finding a 50% higher rate among sexual minority men, and another encountering no differences across sexual orientations.

Issues affecting bisexual people
Typically, bisexual individuals and their health and well-being are not studied independently of lesbian and gay individuals. Thus, there is limited research on the health issues that affect bisexual individuals. However, the research that has been done has found striking disparities between bisexuals and heterosexuals, and even between bisexuals and homosexuals.

It is important to consider that the majority of bisexual individuals are well-adjusted and healthy, despite having higher instances of health issues than the heterosexual population.

Body image and eating disorders
Youth who reported having sex with both males and females are at the greatest risk for disordered eating, unhealthy weight control practices compared to youth who only have same- or other-gender sex. Bisexual women are twice as likely as lesbians to have an eating disorder and, if they are out, to be twice as likely as heterosexual women to have an eating disorder.

Mental health and suicide

Bisexual females are higher on suicidal intent, mental health difficulties and mental health treatment than bisexual males. In a survey by Stonewall Scotland, 7% of bisexual men had attempted suicide in the past year. Bisexual women are twice as likely as heterosexual women to report suicidal ideation if they have disclosed their sexual orientation to a majority of individuals in their lives; those who are not disclosed are three times more likely. Bisexual individuals have a higher prevalence of suicidal ideation and attempts than heterosexual individuals, and more self-injurious behavior than gay men and lesbians. A 2011 survey found that 44 per cent of bisexual middle and high school students had thought about suicide in the past month.

Substance use
Female adolescents who report relationships with same- and other-sex partners have higher rates of hazardous alcohol use and substance use disorders. This includes higher rates of marijuana and other illicit drug use. Behaviorally and self-identified bisexual women are significantly more likely to smoke cigarettes and have been drug users as adolescents than heterosexual women.

Cancer
Bisexual women are more likely to be nulliparous, overweight and obese, have higher smoking rates and alcohol drinking than heterosexual women, all risk factors for breast cancer. Bisexual men practicing receptive anal intercourse are at higher risk for anal cancer caused by the human papillomavirus (HPV).

HIV/AIDS and sexual health
Most research on HIV/AIDS focuses on gay and bisexual men than lesbians and bisexual women. Evidence for risky sexual behavior in bisexually behaving men has been conflicted. Bisexually active men have been shown to be just as likely as gay or heterosexual men to use condoms. Men who have sex with men and women are less likely than homosexually behaving men to be HIV-positive or engage in unprotected receptive anal sex, but more likely than heterosexually behaving men to be HIV-positive. Although there are no confirmed cases of HIV transmitted from female to female, women who have sex with both men and women have higher rates of HIV than homosexual or heterosexual women.

In a 2011 nationwide study in the United States, 46.1% of bisexual women reported having experienced rape, compared to 13.1% of lesbians and 17.4% of heterosexual women, a risk factor for HIV.

Issues affecting transgender people

Access to health care

Transgender individuals are often reluctant to seek medical care or are denied access by providers due to transphobia or a lack of knowledge or experience with transgender health. Additionally, in some jurisdictions, health care related to transgender issues, especially sex reassignment therapy, is not covered by medical insurance.

The World Professional Association for Transgender Health (WPATH) Standards of Care provide a set of non-binding clinical guidelines for health practitioners who are treating transgender patients. The Yogyakarta Principles, a global human rights proposal, affirms in Principle 17 that "States shall (g) facilitate access by those seeking body modifications related to gender reassignment to competent, non-discriminatory treatment, care and support.

In the UK, the NHS is legally required to provide treatment for gender dysphoria. As of 2018, Wales refers patients to the Gender Identity Clinic (GIC) in London, but the Welsh government plans to open a gender identity clinic in Cardiff.

In India, a 2004 report claimed that hijras 'face discrimination in various ways' in the Indian health-care system, and sexual reassignment surgery is unavailable in government hospitals in India.

In Bangladesh, health facilities sensitive to hijra culture are virtually non-existent, according to a report on hijra social exclusion.

Denial of health care in the United States

The 2008-2009 National Transgender Discrimination Survey, published by National Gay and Lesbian Task Force and the National Center for Transgender Equality in partnership with the National Black Justice Coalition, shed light on the discrimination transgender and gender non-conforming people face in many aspects of daily life, including in medical and health care settings. The survey reported that 19% of respondents had been refused healthcare by a doctor or other provider because they identify as transgender or gender non-conforming and transgender people of color were more likely to have been refused healthcare. 36% of American Indian and 27% of multi-racial respondents reported being refused healthcare, compared to 17% of white respondents. In addition, the survey found that 28% of respondents said they had been verbally harassed in a healthcare setting and 2% of respondents reported being physically attacked in a doctor's office. Transgender people particularly vulnerable to being assaulted in a doctor's office were those who identify as African-Americans (6%), those who engaged in sex work, drug sales or other underground work (6%), those who transitioned before they were 18 (5%), and those who identified as undocumented or non-citizens (4%).

An updated version of the NTDS survey, called the 2015 U.S. Transgender Survey, was published in December 2016.

Section 1557 of the Affordable Care Act contains nondiscrimination provisions to protect transgender people. In December 2016, however, a federal judge issued an injunction to block the enforcement of "the portion of the Final Rule that interprets discrimination on the basis of 'gender identity' and 'termination of pregnancy'". Under the Trump administration, Roger Severino was appointed as civil rights director for the U.S. Department of Health and Human Services (HHS). Severino opposes Section 1557 and HHS has said it "will not investigate complaints about anti-transgender discrimination," as explained by the National Center for Transgender Equality. When a journalist asked Severino if, under the HHS Conscience and Religious Freedom division whose creation was announced in January 2018, transgender people could be "denied health care," he said "I think denial is a very strong word" and that healthcare "providers who simply want to serve the people they serve according to their religious beliefs" should be able to do so without fear of losing federal funding. On May 24, 2019, Severino announced a proposal to reverse this portion of Section 1557, and, as of April 23, 2020, the Justice Department was reportedly reviewing the Trump administration's "final rule" which HHS acknowledged would reverse Section 1557's gender identity protections.

On April 2, 2019, Texas Senate Bill 17 passed by a vote of 19–12. It would allow state-licensed professionals such as doctors, pharmacists, lawyers, and plumbers to deny services to anyone if the professional cites a religious objection. To reveal the motivations behind the bill, opponents proposed an amendment to prohibit discrimination based on sexual orientation or gender identity; the amendment failed 12–19.

On October 15, 2019, federal judge Reed O'Connor vacated the part of the Affordable Care Act that protects transgender people. The ruling means that federally-funded healthcare insurers and providers may deny treatment or coverage based on sex, gender identity or termination of pregnancy, and that doctors aren't required to provide any services whatsoever to transgender people—even if they're the same services provided to non-transgender people, and even if they're medically necessary.

Hormone treatment for transgender youth is illegal in Tennessee. On May 18, 2021, Governor Bill Lee signed a healthcare bill specifically prohibiting healthcare providers from prescribing hormone treatment for gender dysphoria in prepubertal minors, specifically allowing other hormone treatments to be prescribed for conditions such as growth deficiencies.

Transgender youth healthcare
Legislators in 25 US states have introduced bills to restrict access to gender-affirming medical care for minors in the past two years. As of August 2022, these bills have become law in Alabama, Arkansas, Arizona, and Tennessee. Relevant professional organizations including The American Medical Association, The American Academy of Pediatrics, The American Psychiatric Association, and The American Academy of Child & Adolescent Psychiatry have explicitly voiced opposition to these laws. Most of these laws include sections that would penalize any healthcare providers that would acknowledge gender affirming care for transgender youth.

Insurance coverage

Although they are not the only uninsured population in the United States, transgender people are less likely than cisgender people to have access to health insurance and if they do, their insurance plan may not cover medically necessary services. The National Transgender Discrimination Survey reported that 19% of survey respondents stated that they had no health insurance compared to 15% of the general population. They were also less likely to be insured by an employer. Undocumented non-citizens had particularly high rates of non-coverage (36%) as well as African-Americans (31%), compared to white respondents (17%).

While a majority of U.S. insurance policies expressly exclude coverage for transgender care, regulations are shifting to expand coverage of transgender and gender non-conforming health care. A number of private insurance carriers cover transgender-related health care under the rubric of "transgender services", "medical and surgical treatment of gender identity disorder", and "gender reassignment surgery". Nine states (California, Colorado, Connecticut, Illinois, Massachusetts, New York, Oregon, Vermont, and Washington) and the District of Columbia require that most private insurance plans cover medically necessary health care for transgender patients.

Depending on where they live, some transgender people are able to access gender-specific health care through public health insurance programs. Medicaid does not have a federal policy on transgender health care and leaves the regulation of the coverage of gender-confirming health care up to each state. While Medicaid does not fund sex reassignment surgery in forty states, several, like New York and Oregon, now require Medicaid to cover (most) transgender care.

Cancer
Cancers related to hormone use include breast cancer and liver cancer. In addition, trans men who have not had removal of the uterus, ovaries, or breasts remain at risk to develop cancer of these organs, while trans women remain at risk for prostate cancer. The likelihood of prostate cancer in transgender women taking anti-androgens is significantly lower than in cisgender men.

Mental health

According to transgender advocate Rebecca Allison, trans people are "particularly prone" to depression and anxiety: "In addition to loss of family and friends, they face job stress and the risk of unemployment.  Trans people who have not transitioned and remain in their birth gender are very prone to depression and anxiety.  Suicide is a risk, both prior to transition and afterward.  One of the most important aspects of the transgender therapy relationship is management of depression and/or anxiety."
Depression is significantly correlated with experienced discrimination. In a study of San Francisco trans women, 62% reported depression. In a 2003 study of 1093 trans men and trans women, there was a prevalence of 44.1% for clinical depression and 33.2% for anxiety.

Suicide attempts are common in transgender people. In some transgender populations the majority have attempted suicide at least once. 41% of the respondents of the National Transgender Discrimination Survey reported having attempted suicide. This statistic was even higher for certain demographics – for example, 56% of American Indian and Alaskan Native transgender respondents had attempted suicide. In contrast, 1.6% of the American population has attempted suicide. In the sample all minority ethnic groups (Asian, Latino, black, American Indian and mixed race) had higher prevalence of suicide attempts than white people. Number of suicide attempts was also correlated with life challenges - 64% of those surveyed who had been sexually assaulted had attempted suicide. 76% who had been assaulted by teachers or other school staff had made an attempt.

In 2012 the Scottish Transgender Alliance conducted the Trans Mental Health Study. 74% of the respondents who had transitioned reported improved mental health after transitioning. 53% had self-harmed at some point, and 11% currently self-harmed. 55% had been diagnosed with or had a current diagnosis of depression. An additional 33% believed that they currently had depression, or had done in the past, but had not been diagnosed. 5% had a current or past eating disorder diagnosis. 19% believed that they had had an eating disorder or currently had one, but had not been diagnosed. 84% of the sample had experienced suicide ideation and 48% had made a suicide attempt. 3% had attempted suicide more than 10 times. 63% of respondents who transitioned thought about and attempted suicide less after transitioning. Other studies have found similar results.

Trans women appear to be at greater risk than trans men and the general population of dying of suicide. However, trans men are more likely to attempt suicide than trans women.

Personality disorders are common in transgender people.

Gender identity disorder is currently classed as a psychiatric condition by the DSM IV-TR. The upcoming DSM-5 removes GID and replaces it with 'gender dysphoria', which is not classified by some authorities as a mental illness. Until the 1970s, psychotherapy was the primary treatment for GID. However, today the treatment protocol involves biomedical interventions, with psychotherapy on its own being unusual.

There has been controversy about the inclusion of transsexuality in the DSM, one claim being that Gender Identity Disorder of Childhood was introduced to the DSM-III in 1980 as a 'backdoor-maneuver' to replace homosexuality, which was removed from the DSM-II in 1973.

Hormones
Transgender individuals frequently take hormones to achieve feminizing or masculinizing effects.  Side effects of hormone use include increased risk of blood clotting, high or low blood pressure, elevated blood sugar, water retention, dehydration, electrolyte disturbances, liver damage, increased risk for heart attack and stroke. Use of unprescribed hormones is common, but little is known about the associated risks. One potential hazard is HIV transmission from needle sharing. Transgender men seeking to get pregnant were once told that they needed to stop hormone therapy or testosterone treatment as it could be difficult to become pregnant or could cause potential birth defects, however it now seems that this may not be necessary. More research needs to be conducted in this field in order to make a definitive conclusion.

Injectable silicone
Some trans women use injectable silicone, sometimes administered by lay persons, to achieve their desired physique. This is most frequently injected into the hip and buttocks. It is associated with considerable medical complications, including morbidity.   Such silicone may migrate, causing disfigurement years later.  Non-medical grade silicone may contain contaminants, and may be injected using a shared needle. In New York City silicone injection occurs frequently enough to be called 'epidemic', with a NYC survey of trans women finding that 18% were receiving silicone injections from 'black market' providers.

Sexually transmitted infections
Trans people (especially trans women – trans men have actually been found to have a lower rate of HIV than the general US population) are frequently forced into sex work to make a living, and are subsequently at increased risk for STIs including HIV. According to the National Transgender Discrimination Survey, 2.64% of American transgender people are HIV positive, and transgender sex workers are over 37 times more likely than members of the general American population to be HIV positive. HIV is also more common in trans people of color. For example, in a study by the National Institute of Health more than 56% of African-American trans women were HIV-positive compared to 27% of trans women in general. This has been connected to how trans people of color are more likely to be sex workers.

A 2012 meta analysis of studies assessing rates of HIV infection among transgender women in 15 countries found that trans women are 49 times more likely to have HIV than the general population. HIV positive trans persons are likely to be unaware of their status. In one study, 73% of HIV-positive trans women were unaware of their status.

Latin American trans women have a HIV prevalence of 18%-38% as of 2016, but most Latin American countries do not recognize transgender people as a population. Therefore, there are no laws catering to their health needs.

Transgender people have higher levels of interaction with the police than the general population. 7% of transgender Americans have been held in prison cell simply due to their gender identity/expression. This rate is 41% for transgender African-Americans.  16% of respondents had been sexually assaulted in prison, a risk factor for HIV. 20% of trans women are sexually assaulted in prison, compared to 6% of trans men. Trans women of color are more likely to be assaulted whilst in prison. 38% of black trans women report having been sexually assaulted in prison compared to 12% of white trans women.

In a San Francisco study, 68% of trans women and 55% of trans men reported having been raped, a risk factor for HIV.

Substance use
Trans people are more likely than the general population to use substances.  For example, studies have shown that trans men are 50% more likely, and trans women 200% more likely to smoke cigarettes than other populations. It has been suggested that tobacco use is high among transgender people because many use it to maintain weight loss.
In one study of transgender people, the majority had a history of non-injection drug use with the rates being 90% for marijuana, 66% for cocaine, 24% for heroin, and 48% for crack.
It has been suggested that transgender people who are more accepted by their families are less likely to develop substance use issues.

In the Trans Mental Health Study 2012, 24% of participants had used drugs within the past year. The most commonly used drug was cannabis. 19% currently smoked.
A study published in 2013 found that among a sample of transgender adults, 26.5% had engaged in non-medical use of prescription drugs, most commonly analgesics.

Gynecologic and reproductive care 
Transgender and nonbinary people often encounter additional unique barriers in attaining gynecologic and reproductive care. Providers and staff often make assumptions about gender identity or expression of patients in a "women's health" clinic and many providers lack cultural competence in caring for transgender and nonbinary patients. Furthermore, many providers are not adequately trained in order to help the LGBTQ+ community.  There are still many gaps in knowledge when it comes to issues such as hormone therapy and how it may impact pregnancy or fertility.  Challenges in accessing insurance coverage is another common barrier to Ob/Gyn healthcare for transgender and nonbinary patients.

Health of LGBT people of color
In a review of research, Balmsam, Molina, et al., found that "LGBT issues were addressed in 3,777 articles dedicated to public health; of these, 85% omitted information on race/ethnicity of participants". However, studies that have noted race have found significant health disparities between white LGBT people and LGBT people of color.
LGBT health research has also been criticized for lack of diversity in that, for example, a study may call for lesbians, but many black and minority ethnic groups do not use the term lesbian or gay to describe themselves.

There have not been many studies dedicated to researching health issues in LGBT people of color until fairly recently. Studies have determined that LGBT individuals have an elevated risk of early mortality and more mental and physical health issues than heterosexual individuals.  In particular, A study conducted by Kim, Jen, Fredriksen-Goldsen published in 2017 delved deeper into the health disparities found among LGBT older adults. It is well known in comparison with white LGBT older adults, black and Latino LGBT older adults tend to have a lower quality of life in relation to their health. The study finds that this is due to a variety of factors, including discrimination, educational attainment, income levels, and social resources. Black LGBT adults experienced higher levels of LGBT discrimination than their white counterparts. However, the study found that black and Latino LGBT adults had comparable mental health to white LGBT elders, presumed to be due to increased levels of spirituality characteristic of Latino and African American communities.

The influences of racism, homophobia, and transphobia can have detrimental effects on mental health of LGBT people of color, especially in intersection with one another. Velez, Polihronakis et al.  look at prior research that indicates that experiences of homophobia and internalized homophobia are associated with poor mental health. Similar research also indicates that racism and internalized racism are associated with poor mental health as well. When combined, discrimination and internalized oppression interact with one another and contribute to psychological distress. Both homophobia and racism contribute additively to distress, but it was noted that homophobic discrimination and internalized racism had the most significant and detrimental effects on well-being. This study shows similar results to previous research in this aspect. This pattern was also seen in a sample of LGBT Latinx people.

There are significant gaps in knowledge regarding health disparities among transgender individuals. In general, transgender individuals tends to be effected the most acutely by LGBT issues. This is even more prominent in transgender people of color. Transgender individuals are also more likely to experience greater socioeconomic disadvantages, greater stressors, and more exposure to traumatic events. Transgender individuals, particularly transgender individuals of color, struggle with access and discriminatory treatment when seeking medical and mental health care access.

Transgender people and people of color both struggle with poor health care experiences, both medical and regarding mental health, in the United States. When looking at the experiences of transgender people of color, healthcare provider's assumptions and biases about them negatively influence their healthcare experience. Even when seeking care from LGBT specific or LGBT friendly health care providers, people of color often worry about experiencing racism. Positive healthcare experiences for transgender people of color can most often be attributed to provider's respect and knowledge around gender identity and sexuality, as well as cultural competency.

LGBT people also routinely struggle with medical and mental health care access in relation to the general public. Transgender people as noted above, transgender and gender nonconforming people are significantly more likely  to express concerns about how they will be treated in seeking healthcare. LGBT people of color and LGBT people with low incomes were found to be more likely to experience care that was discriminatory and substandard. In particular, transgender people of color and transgender people with low incomes were more likely to experience care that is discriminatory and substandard. These issues are highlighted in health care institutions serving populations with limited access, options, or significant health care disparities. This is particularly true of public hospitals, which have fewer resources than nonprofit hospitals and academic medical centers, and are under deeper financial pressures. Public hospitals have very little incentive to invest in care for marginalized populations, and as such there has been very little progress on LGBT inclusion in health care. The healthcare community itself has contributed to LGBT health disparities, through prejudice and inadequate knowledge. Correcting these disparities will require a significant investment by the healthcare system.

A study conducted by Gowin, Taylor, Dunnington, Alshuwaiyer, and Cheney researches the needs of this demographic. All of the transgender asylum seekers studied had experienced some form of threat, physical assault, and/or sexual assault while living in Mexico. Stressors were reduced upon arrival in the United States, but not all and few were eliminated. Stressors included assaults (verbal, physical, and sexual), unstable environments, fear of safety, concealing undocumented status, and economic insecurity. These lead to multiple health consequences, including mental illness, sleep issues, isolation, substance use, and suicidal tendencies. Asylum seekers often had difficulties accessing health care services for hormones, and often withheld information during treatment for fear of being reported for holding undocumented status. Distrust of authority figures is not uncommon in minority groups. Methods of contact that allow trust should be built to encourage access to health services. Health promotion practices have found some success; including the use of lay health workers, which also has the benefit of employing community members. A focus on inclusive and non-judgmental communication methods in training and development can also help reduce distrust of health services by transgender and ethnic minority patients.

Healthcare education
Various bodies have called for dedicated teaching on LGBT issues for healthcare students and professionals, including the World Health Organization and the Association of American Medical Colleges. A 2017 systematic review found that dedicated training improved knowledge, attitudes and practice, but noted that programmes often had minimal involvement by LGBT individuals themselves.

Ob/gyn residents in the state of Illinois were asked to complete an online survey in order to assess their confidence to treat LGBTQ+ patients and share their experiences with LGBTQ+ individuals.  Approximately 60% of the residents said that they had no experience with LGBTQ+ folks outside of the work setting .  In a work setting, the results showed that the majority of the Ob/gyn residents felt unprepared to treat lesbian, bisexual, or transgender patients.  About 63% of this group shared that their medical programs provide 1–5 years of LGBTQ+ healthcare training, with some residents saying that they received no education on this in the past year.  A specific area that Ob/gyn residents in Illinois reported not feeling prepared to deal with included hormonal therapy for transgender patients.  From this study, 90% of Ob/gyn residents report having a strong desire to learn more about how to provide healthcare for the LGBTQ+ community, but due to curriculum crowding, there has been some barriers to achieving this goal.

Several government-funded organizations have launched other initiatives to involve LGBT individuals:

"Healthy People 2020: Lesbian, Gay, Bisexual, and Transgender Health" is a government-funded initiative sponsored by the Office of Disease Prevention and Health Promotion, based on a 10-year agenda with the goal of improving the nation's health in measurable ways. "The Health of Lesbian, Gay, Bisexual, and Transgender People: Building a Foundation for Better Understanding" written by the Institute of Medicine and based on research funded by the National Institutes of Health emphasizes the importance of collecting data on the demographics of LGBT populations, improving methods for collecting this data, and increasing the participation of LGBT individuals in research. "LGBT Health and Well-being" published by the US Department of Health & Human Services (HHS), this 2012 report outlines the LGBT Issues Coordinating Committee's objectives for 2011 and 2012. The HHS also hosts an online center for information on LGBT health, including HHS reports, information on access to health care, and resources organized for specific communities within the LGBT population (including LGBT youth, people living with HIV, refugees, women, and older adults).

In addition, many nonprofit initiatives have worked to connect LGBT people to competent healthcare. OutCare Health and Health Professionals Advancing LGBTQ Equality (formerly known as the Gay & Lesbian Medical Association) hosts an online directories of culturally-competent medical professionals.

In 2019, WAXOH, in partnership with DatingPositives, The Phluid Project, Bi.org, Hairrari, the OUT Foundation, launched #WeNeedAButton, a campaign that calls for patient-matching sites like Yelp and ZocDoc to add a queer-friendly button or filter, so that consumers can easily see which doctors are LGBTQ-friendly. The campaign was launched during Pride 2019, on the 50th anniversary of Stonewall, and was supported by ambassador and journalist Zachary Zane and sexual health advocate Josh Robbins.

Kaiser Permanente, the third-largest health care organization in the country and headquartered in Oakland, has been recognized by the Human Rights Campaign Foundation for its commitment to LGBTQ in its 2018 Healthcare Equality Index, and has designated the organization a "healthcare equality leader" every year since 2010.

Additionally, universities including the University of Michigan have provided Continuing Medical Education courses or modules to OB/GYNs in order to be able to better serve the LGBTQ+ community. There are five modules available on YouTube that are each about fifteen minutes long and cover topics such as gender identity and insurance coverage for transgender individuals.  These modules were created by physicians and activists.

COVID-19

In April 2020, educators at the University of Toronto emphasized the need to educate health care practitioners about the vulnerability of LGBTQ+ people in the COVID-19 pandemic. Additionally, during the pandemic, 56% of LGBT youth reported poor mental health.

See also 

 LGBT healthcare in the United States Veterans Health Administration
 Health equity § LGBT minority group health disparities
 Healthcare inequality
 LGBT people in prison#Health care
 Minority stress and health outcomes among sexual minorities
 Suicide among LGBT youth
 Steven Epstein (academic)
 Tamsin Wilton

References

External links

Lesbian, Gay, Bisexual and Transgender Health (Centers for Disease Control and Prevention)
Planned Parenthood's LGBT Health & Wellness Project, "Out for Health"
Center of Excellence for Transgender Health
Publications on health and social care compiled by research from Stonewall, an LGB rights organisation in the UK